Hamengkubuwono V (also spelled Hamengkubuwana V, Yogyakarta, 24 January 1820 – Yogyakarta, 5 June 1855) was the fifth Sultan of Yogyakarta, reigning from 19 December 1823, to 17 August 1826, and then from 17 January 1828, to 5 June 1855 being interspersed by the rule of Hamengkubuwono II due to the then political instability.

Early life 
Born as Gusti Raden Mas Gathot Menol, he was the 6th son of Hamengkubuwono IV and his queen consort, Gusti Kangjeng Ratu Kencono. When he was 3 years old, he was crowned as Hamengkubuwono V, and ruled for 2.5 years before being succeeded by his great-grandfather, Hamengkubuwono II. Hamengkubuwono V was recrowned after his great-grandfather's death.

Upon reaching adulthood, he was styled Prince Mangkubumi. He was made lieutenant colonel in 1839 and colonel in 1847 by Dutch East Indies government.

Reign 
Hamengkubuwono V himself made his realm closer with Dutch colonial government intended as a passive war, where he insisted a bloodless struggle, hoping that there would be a mutual cooperation between Yogyakarta Sultanate and Dutch government, leading to the rise of prosperity and security of Yogyakarta people. On the other side, he also focused on art. During his reign, wayang wong performances had been held for 5 times. He also created some royal dances, the most popular was Serimpi dance and its variants.

However, his policy was opposed by some court's servants and his own brother, GRM Mustojo. They saw that Hamengkubuwono V's policy would be ashamed of Yogyakarta Palace as a coward, leading to the decline of support towards himself and the rise of support towards Mustojo. The situation was increasingly beneficial to Mustojo after marrying a Bruneian princess and made a close brotherhood with Sultanate of Brunei. Hamengkubuwono V's rule was increasingly cornered after the emergence of internal conflict involving his own 5th wife, Kanjeng Mas Hemawati. Hamengkubuwono V only gained support from his subjects who felt safe and prosperous during his reign.

Hamengkubuwono V died after being stabbed by his 5th wife, Kanjeng Mas Hemawati, whose reason to murder her own husband is unknown.

When the incident took place, his queen consort, Kanjeng Ratu Sekar Kedaton, was pregnant, and gave birth a son 13 days later. The son was named Timur Muhammad.

Hamengkubuwono V was succeeded by his brother, GRM Mustojo, styled as Hamengkubuwono VI.

Personal life 
He married Raden Ajeng Suradinah, daughter of Prince Purwanegara and Gusti Kanjeng Ratu Anom. Her mother was Hamengkubuwono II's daughter. She was his first queen consort styled as Gusti Kanjeng Ratu Kencana or Her Royal Highness Queen Kencana. However, unfortunately the couple divorced. Later, Queen Kencana well-known as Queen Sasi after their divorced.

His second queen consort was Queen Sekar Kedhaton, born as Raden Ajeng Andaliyah, daughter of Prince Hadinegara or also known as Prince Suryaning-Ngalaga, a son of Hamengkubuwono III by his concubine. She gave birth to Gusti Raden Mas Timur Muhammad, the future Prince Suryaning-Ngalaga. Actually, Timur Muhammad was the right successor of his father seeing that he was the only child who was born from Queen Sekar Kedhaton. But, his uncle Hamengkubuwono VI took the throne for himself after the death of Hamengkubuwono V.

His most famous concubine was Kanjeng Mas Hemawati who killed him. She might be born as a commoner if we notice her names using the word "Mas" instead of "Raden".

Notes

Literature
 Purwadi. 2007. Sejarah Raja-Raja Jawa. Yogyakarta: Media Ilmu.
 Heryanto F. 2004. Mengenal Keraton Ngayogyakarta Hadiningrat. Yogyakarta: Warna Grafika.

1820 births
1855 deaths
19th-century murdered monarchs
Sultans of Yogyakarta
Burials at Imogiri
Indonesian royalty
Deaths by stabbing